Charles Gaikia is an Anglican bishop in Kenya: he was the Bishop of Nyahururu from 1998 to 2013.

Notes

21st-century Anglican bishops of the Anglican Church of Kenya
Anglican bishops of Nyahururu